Jack Metzler may refer to:

 John C. Metzler, Sr. (1909-1990), superintendent of Arlington National Cemetery, 1951–1972
 John C. Metzler, Jr. (born 1947), current superintendent of Arlington National Cemetery